Obesotoma starobogatovi is a species of sea snail, a marine gastropod mollusk in the family Mangeliidae.

Gastropods.com considers this name a nomen nudum.

Description

Distribution
This marine species occurs in Arctic Russia.

References

 Bogdanov, I.P. (1990) Molluscs of the subfamily Oenopotinae (Gastropoda, Pectinibranchia, Turridae) of seas of the USSR. 223 pp. Nauka, Leningrad. [in Russian].
 Kantor, Y.I. & Sysoev, A.V. (eds), 2005. Catalogue of molluscs of Russia and adjacent countries. Moscow

starobogatovi
Gastropods described in 1990